TKO is the 2000 debut album of Tsakani Mhinga or "TK" on Township Records. The album received 4 nominations at the South African Music Awards, winning Best R&B Album. The single released was "Mind Yo' Business".

Track list
Secret Confessions
PHD
I'm Not Down
Mind Yo Businezz
Ordinary Man
Only In Love
I Love You Baby
Kissing The Void
Secret Confession House Mix
Not Down London
Mind Yo Businezz Kwaito Mix

References

2000 albums
Tsakani Mhinga albums